Emilio Nicolas Sr. (27 October 1930 – 12 October 2019) was an American businessman credited with helping to create one of the earliest Spanish-language television stations in the United States. Nicolas established KWEX-TV in San Antonio, which became the cornerstone of the network that would later become Univision.

Life and career
Born in Frontera, Coahuila, Mexico in 1930, Nicolas initially came to the United States to learn English and attended St. Mary's University in San Antonio, Texas. He graduated in 1951 with a bachelor's degree in biology and chemistry with a minor in math. He went on to earn a master's degree at Trinity University in San Antonio in 1952 before going to work for the Southwest Foundation for Biomedical Research as a researcher on arteriosclerosis and the polio vaccine.

In 1955, Nicolas joined KCOR, America's first full-time Spanish-language station, as a producer and director of news. By day, he oversaw the news department, and by night, he produced live programming. At the time, about 50% of the programs on KCOR were live and entertainment shows that featured a host of the best available talent from Mexico. Many of these shows were broadcast from the studios of the KXTN radio station which aired the programs simultaneously.

The station was popular among the Mexican and Spanish-speaking residents of San Antonio, however advertisers did not acknowledge the market and failed to use it for promotions. At the time, Hispanic viewers were not accounted for in the standard ratings services. Many viewers were cautious about acknowledging their heritage or disclosing their exposure to Spanish language media for fear of discrimination.

In 1961, after spending heavily on live talent and receiving limited financial support from the advertising agencies, Raoul A. Cortez sold KCOR-TV to Nicolas and a group of investors. Nicolas renamed the station KWEX, which would become the hub of operations for the Spanish International Network, the predecessor to Univision. The call letters for KCOR-AM were kept for the radio station and it continued to broadcast Spanish-language programming.

Nicolas set up KWEX to operate by distributing content across the country via satellite, a technique that would later be replicated by CNN and Fox News.

SIN grew and began airing the national Spanish-language television newscast in 1981. The network was first sold to Hallmark Cards in the 1980s and later became Univision. In 2006, the National Association of Broadcasters jointly honored Nicolas and Cortez for their pioneering work bringing Hispanic programming to America.

In the 1960s, Nicolas successfully lobbied the U.S. Congress to mandate that all television sets be equipped to receive both VHF and UHF signals.

In 1975, Nicolas launched the Teleton Navideno, a televised drive to raise money for the less fortunate in San Antonio during the holidays. He was Chairman of the National Association of Spanish Broadcasters and served on the boards of the University of the Incarnate Word, Southwest Foundation, the Moody College of Communication, the University of Texas Health Science Center at Houston, the Mexican American Legal Defense and Educational Fund, and the San Antonio Chamber of Commerce.

In 2019, the headquarters of Texas Public Radio was renamed in honor of Nicolas and his wife, Irma.

On 12 October 2019, he died in San Antonio at the age of 88.

References 

1930 births
2019 deaths
American media executives
American radio executives
American television executives
Mexican emigrants to the United States
Businesspeople from Texas
St. Mary's University, Texas alumni
Trinity University (Texas) alumni
People from Frontera, Coahuila
20th-century American businesspeople